Kinley Gibson (born January 16, 1995) is a Canadian track and road bicycle racer currently living in Edmonton, AB. She competed at the 2013 UCI Juniors Track World Championships in the Women's scratch race, finishing 2nd. At the 2013 UCI Road World Championships she finished 9th in the junior time trial.

Palmares
2013
1st  National Junior Time Trial championship 
3rd National Junior Road race championships 
1st  National Junior Criterium championship 
2nd National Junior Track championships - Points race
1st  National Junior Track championship - Individual pursuit
1st  National Junior Track championship - Omnium
2nd National Junior Track championships - Individual Time Trial
2nd UCI World Junior Track championships - Scratch race

2016
1st  Team Pursuit Pan American Track Championships (with Ariane Bonhomme, Jamie Gilgen and Jasmin Glaesser)
2nd Points Race, Milton International Challenge

2017
2nd  Team Pursuit, Round 1, (Pruszków) Track Cycling World Cup (with Ariane Bonhomme, Allison Beveridge and Annie Foreman-Mackey)

References

External links

Canadian female cyclists
Cyclists from Alberta
Sportspeople from Edmonton
1995 births
Living people
Cyclists at the 2018 Commonwealth Games
Commonwealth Games competitors for Canada